
Gmina Szczebrzeszyn is an urban-rural gmina (administrative district) in Zamość County, Lublin Voivodeship, in eastern Poland.

Villages
Apart from the town of Szczebrzeszyn, Gmina Szczebrzeszyn contains the villages and settlements of Bodaczów, Brody Duże, Brody Małe, Kąty Drugie, Kąty Pierwsze, Kawęczyn, Kawęczynek, Lipowiec-Kolonia, Niedzieliska, Niedzieliska-Kolonia, Wielącza, Wielącza Poduchowna and Wielącza-Kolonia.

Neighbouring gminas
Gmina Szczebrzeszyn is bordered by the gminas of Nielisz, Radecznica, Sułów, Zamość and Zwierzyniec.

References

Polish official population figures 2006

Szczebrzeszyn
Zamość County